Daniel Raymond Flynn (born 16 April 1985) is a New Zealand former cricketer who played for Northern Districts and has also represented the New Zealand international side. In April 2020, Flynn announced his retirement from cricket.

Domestic career
He has captained the New Zealand Under-19 side in Youth ODIs. He was educated at Tauranga Boys' College and was in the 1st XI from 1999 to 2002, being captain in his last two years.

Daniel is a resident of Tauranga, which is in the Bay of Plenty, New Zealand. This falls into the catchment area of the Northern Districts Cricket Association. He has played two seasons at Barnards Green Cricket Club in Worcestershire, England. Daniel holds the league record for runs scored in the Worcestershire League with a highest score of 184. In March 2011 Flynn joined Dunfermline Knights, Scotland, to play for the 2011 season.

In June 2018, he was awarded a contract with Northern Districts for the 2018–19 season. In November 2019, during the 2019–20 Plunket Shield season, Flynn played in his 100th first-class match.

International career
On 6 February 2008, Flynn took the place of the injured Jacob Oram for the second international Twenty20 against England, having impressed on 30 January, hitting 149 in a domestic match. New Zealand fell to a second defeat in the Twenty20 series, however, with Flynn surviving only two deliveries, making one run, before being dismissed by Graeme Swann. He then replaced an out-of-form Peter Fulton for the final One Day International on 23 February 2008. Flynn then accompanied the New Zealand team to England and, on 15 May 2008 made his test debut.

On 23 May, whilst batting at number 6 for New Zealand, against England, Flynn was hit in the grille by a rising ball from James Anderson. Flynn retired hurt and lost a tooth. It was also stated on TMS that more teeth were loosened and removed by a dentist later that day.

References

External links
 
 

1985 births
Living people
New Zealand cricketers
New Zealand Test cricketers
New Zealand One Day International cricketers
New Zealand Twenty20 International cricketers
New Zealand Youth One Day International captains
Northern Districts cricketers
Sportspeople from Rotorua